Marcus Sandberg (born 7 November 1990) is a Swedish footballer who plays for Eliteserien club HamKam as a goalkeeper.

Career statistics

Honours

Club
IFK Göteborg
 Svenska Cupen: 2012–13, 2014–15

References

External links

1990 births
Living people
People from Tjörn Municipality
Association football goalkeepers
IFK Göteborg players
Swedish footballers
Allsvenskan players
Superettan players
Sweden under-21 international footballers
Sweden youth international footballers
Vålerenga Fotball players
Stabæk Fotball players
Hamarkameratene players
Eliteserien players
Swedish expatriate footballers
Expatriate footballers in Norway
Swedish expatriate sportspeople in Norway
Sportspeople from Västra Götaland County